Established in 1990, The Illinois Hispanic Chamber of Commerce (IHCC) has grown to become one of the largest and most influential business organizations and is by far the leading Hispanic business group in the state of Illinois.  IHCC works to generate resources and advocate on behalf of Hispanic businesses and is the preferred source of guidance, assistance, and networking opportunities for Hispanic business owners in Illinois.

The chamber enjoys outstanding relationships with Hispanic and other key stakeholders including elected officials and community leaders. IHCC has a membership base 1,400 strong and access to networks that enable it to reach thousands of Hispanic businesses beyond its membership. IHCC works in close partnership with Hispanic and non-Hispanic business organizations throughout the State of Illinois.

Programs 

IHCC provides counseling, technical assistance and training through its various programs and has the closest, most direct contact with Hispanic business owners. IHCC works directly with hundreds of business owners annually who receive free, individual one-on-one counseling and guidance and participate in training sessions. IHCC programs include the Illinois Hispanic Entrepreneurship Center (IHEC), Illinois Small Business Development Center (SBDC), Procurement Technical Assistance Center (PTAC), and Drug Free Workplace.

See also
United States Hispanic Chamber of Commerce
Greater Philadelphia Hispanic Chamber of Commerce

References

External links
 Illinois Hispanic Chamber of Commerce
 United States Hispanic Chamber of Commerce
 United States Chamber of Commerce

Organizations based in Chicago
Hispanic and Latino American culture in Chicago